Ghetto Pop Life is a collaborative studio album by Danger Mouse & Jemini. It was released on Lex Records in 2003. It features guest appearances from Tha Liks, J-Zone, Prince Po, and The Pharcyde. In 2004, a reprint of the album with three additional tracks was released in the United States.

Lex Records also released three EPs with tracks (and remixes of tracks) from the album: Take Care of Business, Conceited Bastard, and 26 Inch EP. Moreover, there was a special promotional CD, titled Ghetto Pop Mix, a mixtape with short remixes of the tracks from the album fading into each other, along with a couple of new exclusive tracks.

Critical reception
Mark Pytlik of AllMusic gave the album 4 stars out of 5, saying: "Evocative without being pointlessly nostalgic and fun without being goofy, Ghetto Pop Life is a convincingly strong debut." Dom Passantino of Stylus Magazine gave the album a grade of "A", calling it "not only one of the best albums of the year, but also possibly the strangest."

Pitchfork placed it at number 37 on the "Top 50 Albums of 2003" list. The Guardian named it the 19th best album of 2003. In 2011, inthemix named it the 48th best dance album of the 2000s. In 2017, ThoughtCo included it on the "100 Best Hip-Hop Albums of the 2000s" list.

Track listing

Ghetto Pop Mix

There were two editions of this promotional mixtape CD: The original one, with eleven tracks, which was only available with the August 2003 issue of Hip-Hop Connection; and an extended version with a total of sixteen tracks.

References

External links
 
 
 

2003 debut albums
Collaborative albums
Danger Mouse (musician) albums
Albums produced by Danger Mouse (musician)
Lex Records albums